Journal of Hand Surgery may refer to:

Journal of Hand Surgery (American Volume), published by Elsevier
Journal of Hand Surgery (European Volume), published by SAGE Publications, formerly known as
Journal of Hand Surgery (British Volume)
Journal of Hand Surgery (British and European Volume)